Curiosa may refer to:

 Curiosa (erotica), erotica and pornography as discrete, collectable items, usually in published or printed form
 Curiosa (film), a 2019 French film directed by Lou Jeunet, with actress Amira Casar
 Curiosa Festival, a 2004 concert tour by the English rock band The Cure